Hello! I'm Tommy Reilly is the second album by Tommy Reilly, following his departure from A&M Records.  It was released on 14 June 2010.  The album was produced by Roddy Hart, who joined Tommy on his tour for Words on the Floor.

Background
Prior to the recording of the album, Reilly was dropped by label A&M Records, and signed a deal with Euphonios.  The album was produced by friend and fellow musician Roddy Hart, and was recorded in his "mum and dad's attic".

Talking about recording the new album, Tommy said:

"We ended up parting ways with A&M, which has turned out to be a blessing in disguise.

"I thought it would be harder to make the next album but a lot of the same people are on board. My manager and press team, promoters and radio pluggers are still working with me.

"The new album is more grown-up and bits of it are heavier lyrically. It is all about the mad things I had to deal with last year.

"The new label is great. I didn't want people to wait too long for the follow-up to the first one."

Track listing
The following is the track listing that has been released for the album:

 "Wrong Room"
 "Some Peace Please"
 "Next Year's Coming"
 "Make the Bed" (vocals by Rachel Sermanni)
 "Tonight We're Young Again"
 "Last Day of Summer"
 "Could Do Better"
 "Take Me Away for the Night"
 "Empty Glass"
 "Who’s Gonna Wait"
 "Badges" (includes hidden track "I Dreamt of New York")

Tour
Throughout May and June, Reilly went on tour supporting Justin Currie and the Proclaimers.  Shortly after he announced a headline tour to take place throughout September.

September tour dates

Credits
All songs written by Tommy Reilly
Produced by Roddy Hart
Mixed and mastered by Paul McGeechan at Waterside Productions Ltd.
Engineered and recorded by Roddy Hart at Odd Art Studios, January–February 2010
Tommy Reilly - Lead vocals, acoustic guitars, classical guitar, electric guitars, piano, hammond organ, wurlitzer, mellotron, synths, percussion
Roddy Hart - Backing vocals, acoustic guitars, piano, hammond organ, wurlitzer, mellotron, synths, percussion
Scott Mackay - drums
Gordin Skone - acoustic guitar and piano on "Empty Glasses"
John Martin - e-bow on "Last Day Of Summer" and "Badges"
Rachel Sermanni - vocals on "Make the Bed"

Album Artwork:
Designed by Scott Macdonald
Photography by Ken Haddock and Paul Bence

References

2010 albums
Tommy Reilly (Scottish musician) albums